Balkan Snowfield (Plato Balkan \'pla-to bal-'kan\) is an ice-covered plateau of elevation ranging from  in eastern Livingston Island in the South Shetland Islands, Antarctica, situated south of lower Perunika Glacier, northwest of Huntress Glacier and north of Contell Glacier. The feature slopes gently northwestwards with its foot bounded by the hills along Bulgarian Beach. It is named after the Balkans.

Location
Detailed mapping by the Spanish Servicio Geográfico del Ejército in 1991, and Bulgarian mapping in 1996, 2004 and 2009.

Maps
 Isla Livingston: Península Hurd. Mapa topográfico de escala 1:25000. Madrid: Servicio Geográfico del Ejército, 1991. (Map reproduced on p. 16 of the linked work)
 L.L. Ivanov. Livingston Island: Central-Eastern Region. Scale 1:25000 topographic map.  Sofia: Antarctic Place-names Commission of Bulgaria, 1996.
 L.L. Ivanov et al. Antarctica: Livingston Island and Greenwich Island, South Shetland Islands. Scale 1:100000 topographic map. Sofia: Antarctic Place-names Commission of Bulgaria, 2005.
 L.L. Ivanov. Antarctica: Livingston Island and Greenwich, Robert, Snow and Smith Islands. Scale 1:120000 topographic map.  Troyan: Manfred Wörner Foundation, 2009.  
 Antarctic Digital Database (ADD). Scale 1:250000 topographic map of Antarctica. Scientific Committee on Antarctic Research (SCAR). Since 1993, regularly upgraded and updated.
 L.L. Ivanov. Antarctica: Livingston Island and Smith Island. Scale 1:100000 topographic map. Manfred Wörner Foundation, 2017.

See also
 Hurd Peninsula
 Livingston Island

References
 Balkan Snowfield. SCAR Composite Gazetteer of Antarctica
 Bulgarian Antarctic Gazetteer. Antarctic Place-names Commission. (details in Bulgarian, basic data in English)

External links
 Balkan Snowfield. Copernix satellite image

Landforms of Livingston Island
Bulgaria and the Antarctic